Achal Bakeri is an Indian entrepreneur and founder, chairman and managing director of Symphony Limited.

Early life and education
Bakeri was born in Mumbai, Maharashtra, to father Anil Bakeri, a real estate businessman, and mother Hansabahen.

Bakeri completed his diploma in architecture from CEPT University, located in Ahmedabad, and a Master of Business Administration in the United States from the University of Southern California, located in Los Angeles, California.

Career
He returned to India and started working with his father's real estate business in Ahmedabad.

Symphony
In February 1988, Bakeri started Symphony Limited in Ahmedabad with a seed capital of INR 100,000. The company was about to go bankrupt in 2002, but after purchasing a majority stake in a Mexican company, Bakeri claims it became the world's largest air-cooler manufacturing company. In February 2017, Symphony launched air cooler with multiple features like touch screen, voice assist, mosquito repellent.

Awards and recognitions
Bakeri is the recipient of awards including:

Associations
Bakeri also serves as a director of Symphony Limited, Sanskrut Tradecom Private Limited, Bakeri Engineering & Infrastructure, Harmony Holdings Private Limited, Oras Investments Private Limited, Paratam Investments Private Limited and Bakeri Urban Development.

See also

 List of people from Ahmedabad
 List of University of Southern California people

References
 

Date of birth missing (living people)
20th-century Indian businesspeople
21st-century Indian businesspeople
Chief executives in the manufacturing industry
Businesspeople from Ahmedabad
Indian billionaires
Indian chairpersons of corporations
Indian company founders
Indian expatriates in the United States
Indian industrialists
Living people
Manufacturing in India
Technology company founders
Marshall School of Business alumni
Year of birth missing (living people)